Jay Craven  is a Vermont film director, screenwriter and former professor of film studies at Marlboro College.

Craven is known for creating award-winning films on modest budgets, adopting many of the novels of author Howard Frank Mosher to film. He often casts from a regular troupe of Vermont actors including Tantoo Cardinal and Rusty DeWees, but has also worked with Rip Torn and Kris Kristofferson. Craven founded and runs Kingdom County Productions and recently launched Catamount Arts performing arts program, New England's largest independent arts producer and presenter. He is married to Bess O'Brien, who is also a co-founder of Kingdom County Productions.

Craven attended Boston University for undergraduate studies, where he developed a lifelong friendship with Howard Zinn. He later went on to Goddard College. He lives in the Northeast Kingdom with his family .

Filmography
 Where the Rivers Flow North (1994)
 A Stranger in the Kingdom (1998)
 In Jest (1999)
 The Year That Trembled (2002)
 Disappearances (2006)
 Northern Borders (2013)
 Peter and John (2015)
 Wetware (2018)

References

Interview with New England Film
Faculty page at Marlboro College
Kingdom County Productions

External links

[Jay Craven at Marlboro College http://www.marlboro.edu/academics/faculty/craven_jay/]

 (photo/caption)

Goddard College alumni
People from Barnet, Vermont
Living people
Film directors from Vermont
Year of birth missing (living people)